Murray Davies is a Welsh author and journalist.

He was born into a mining family in South Wales. He won a scholarship to UCW Aberystwyth where he studied international politics, followed by an MA in First World War poetry. He worked for the Daily Mail and Mirror Group as a reporter and feature writer. After twenty years as a journalist, he became a novelist. His novel, Collaborator, won the Sidewise Award for Alternate History in 2003. His other works include The Devils Handshake, Dogs on the Street, Samson Option  and The Drumbeat Of Jimmy Sands.

Davies lives in Wiltshire.

References

External links

Living people
Sidewise Award winners
Year of birth missing (living people)
Alumni of Aberystwyth University